⟨⟩

Crocodile 2: Death Swamp, titled Crocodile 2: Death Roll when broadcast on TV, is a 2002 American horror film directed by Gary Jones and released directly to DVD on August 1, 2002. The film is a loose sequel to the 2000 film Crocodile. It was filmed in Ramoji Film City in Hyderabad, India. Featuring the two surviving crocodiles from the first film. The plotline is about a group of criminals who board an airplane full of tourists with loot from a recent bank robbery. A violent storm compels the pilots to turn around, prompting the crooks to hijack the plane and keep it on course to Mexico. But the storm causes the plane to plummet into a swamp. Then the survivors—among them the robbers' sinister leader, Max (Darryl Theirse), and a pretty flight attendant, Mia (Heidi Noelle Lenhart) -- are pursued by an enormous crocodile with an insatiable appetite.

Plot
After a bank robbery, four criminals try to escape to the village of Santo Cristo in Acapulco, but they hijack the plane when a storm requires the pilot to start to turn around. They force the pilot to continue flying. After the copilot struggles with one of the hijackers, the plane's instrument panel is destroyed and it crashes. Most of the passengers and one of the hijackers die in the crash. The criminals gather the remaining passengers, killing those too injured to be of use, and force the rest to haul their loot through the swamp to the town they need to reach to finish their escape. While they gather the loot, a crocodile suddenly emerges from the water and eats the pilot. The criminals empty three guns into it, killing it.

As they travel through the swamp, they start falling prey to the dead crocodile's furious 30-foot mother (Flat Dog, the crocodile from the first film). As the passengers struggle to survive the crocodile, the only hope for rescue is in the hands of Zach, the boyfriend of one of the stewardesses and a tracker he runs into a bar that he hires to search for the crashed plane. Max (leader of the terrorists) forces the tracker to leave Mia (the stewardess) and Zach behind. But during the flight, Roland (the tracker) grabs Max's gun and shoots Max in the chest, killing him. When Roland tries to turn back, his chopper is grabbed by the crocodile. The crocodile leaves Roland to die in an explosion. Mia and Zach become the only survivors and kill the croc by using a life boat's gasoline and lighting it with her lighter, resulting in the croc blowing up.

At the end of the film, Mia and Zach are at a resort swimming. As Mia jumps in the water the crocodile appears, she then wakes up with Zach, realizing that it was just a dream. A loud roar is heard as the camera zooms out the swamp.

Cast
Heidi Lenhart as Mia Bozeman
Chuck Walczak as Zach Thowler
Jon Sklaroff as Sol
Darryl Theirse as Max
David Valcin as Justin Reynolds
James Parks as Squid
Martin Kove as Roland
Steve Moreno as Brian Bigham
Billy Rieck as Pete
Anna Cranage as Julie Landon
Dan Martin as Pilot 
Sean Euro as Sean

See also
 List of killer crocodile films

References

External links 

 
 

2002 horror films
Giant monster films
American independent films
American natural horror films
Films set in Mexico
Films shot at Ramoji Film City
Nu Image films
Films about crocodilians
2002 films
Films directed by Gary Jones
American sequel films
Direct-to-video horror films
Direct-to-video sequel films
2000s English-language films
2002 independent films
2002 direct-to-video films
Films produced by Boaz Davidson
Films with screenplays by Boaz Davidson
2000s American films